John Wirth is a television showrunner, producer, and writer. From 2012 to mid-2016, he was the showrunner and executive producer for the American Western series Hell on Wheels. He is also credited as a co-creator, executive producer and writer for the Netflix series, Wu Assassins (2019).

His previous producer and writer credits include such series as The Cape (2011), the V remake (2009–2011), Terminator: The Sarah Connor Chronicles (2008–2009), Love Monkey (2006), Ghost Whisperer (2005–2010), Nash Bridges (1996–2001), and Remington Steele (1982–1987).

Hell on Wheels 
On October 29, 2012, the AMC cable channel renewed Hell on Wheels for a third season. It was also announced that series creators Joe and Tony Gayton would step down as series' showrunners, and series producer/writer/director John Shiban would take over. Following the departure of Shiban, the renewal was put on hold until a replacement could be found. On December 12, 2012, AMC announced that Wirth would be the new showrunner for the show's third season. He remained as such throughout the series' run.

Wu Assassins 

On June 29, 2018, it was announced that Wirth was credited as an executive producer, writer and co-creator of the Netflix crime drama Wu Assassins. The series premiered on August 8, 2019.

References

External links
 

Living people
American television producers
American television writers
American male television writers
Date of birth missing (living people)
Year of birth missing (living people)
Showrunners
21st-century American screenwriters
21st-century American male writers